Naomi Bakr (born Aug 03, 1994) is an Egyptian footballer.

References

1995 births
Living people
Women's association football midfielders
Egyptian women's footballers
UC Irvine Anteaters women's soccer players